Michael Patrizi (born 4 May 1984) is an Australian racing driver.

Biography
Starting off in karts in his native Western Australia, he moved to Formula Ford in 2004, then to Formula BMW in Asia 2005, then UK in 2006. In 2007 he joined the competitive ranks for the Formula Three Euroseries racing for the Prema Powerteam. Since 2008 Patrizi has returned home to compete in V8 Supercars and presently competes for Queensland-based team Tekno Autosports.

After two years in V8 Supercars racing for Ford Rising Stars Racing, then Paul Cruickshank Racing, Patrizi lost his seat in V8 Supercars. In February 2010 he made his debut in the Chevrolet Supercars Middle East Championship sedan series at Yas Marina Circuit, coming away with a race win.

In 2010 and 2011 he drove as an endurance driver in the V8 Supercar series and did a full season in the 2011 Australian Carrera Cup Championship. In 2012 Patrizi secured the newly created second seat at Tekno Autosports and had his best ever season in V8 Supercars.

Career results

Champ Car Atlantic

Complete Formula 3 Euro Series results
(key)

Complete Bathurst 1000 results

References

External links 
 Official webpage
 Driver Database stats
 NMD articles
 Motorsport.com - articles and photos

1984 births
Living people
Australian people of Italian descent
Supercars Championship drivers
Atlantic Championship drivers
Formula Ford drivers
Formula 3 Euro Series drivers
Formula BMW UK drivers
Formula BMW USA drivers
Formula BMW Asia drivers
Karting World Championship drivers
People from Kalgoorlie
Racing drivers from Western Australia
Prema Powerteam drivers
Team Meritus drivers
Motaworld Racing drivers
Walker Racing drivers